Chromosera is a genus of fungi in the family Hygrophoraceae. Within the family Hygrophoraceae it is closely related to the genus Gloioxanthomyces. It contains five species. The generic name honors the mycologist Meinhard Moser, and also alludes (chromos) to the distinct coloration of the mushrooms, by overlapping 'chromos' with 'Moser', hence Chromosera.

See also
List of Agaricales genera

References

Fungi of North America
Hygrophoraceae
Agaricales genera